Omali is a village and a community of the Voio municipality. Before the 2011 local government reform it was part of the municipality of Tsotyli, of which it was a municipal district. The 2011 census recorded 63 inhabitants in the village and 98 inhabitants in the community. The settlement of Glykokerasia, with a population of 35 people in 2011, is part of the Omali community. According to the statistics of Vasil Kanchov ("Macedonia, Ethnography and Statistics"), 240 Greek Christians and 350 Vallahades (Grecophone Muslims) lived in the village in 1900.

References

Populated places in Kozani (regional unit)